Donald William Graham (1917-2010) was a major general in the United States Air Force. He commanded the 357th Fighter Group from March to October 1944.

Awards and decorations
Graham's decorations include the Silver Star, Legion of Merit with oak leaf cluster, Distinguished Flying Cross with oak leaf cluster, Air Medal with three oak leaf clusters, Air Force Commendation Medal and Croix de Guerre with Palm (France).

References

External links

1917 births
2010 deaths
United States Army Air Forces pilots of World War II
United States Air Force generals